Rapid Fire is a 2006 action television film starring Jessica Steen and David Cubitt based on the 1980 Norco shootout. While in production it was titled Norco.

Plot
In Norco, California, four men plot a bank robbery using heavy weapons to intimidate the public and the police force. However, one employee activates the silent alarm in the police station, and the criminals are chased by the police and L.A. SWAT. In despair, in Lytle Creek,  the robbers fire about 2,000 rounds, kill one policeman, hit eight others, and damage many cars and one helicopter. In the end, the one survivor was  sentenced to life without parole.

References

External links
 

2005 television films
2005 films
Crime films based on actual events
Canadian drama television films
Canadian crime drama films
2000s crime films
English-language Canadian films
Films directed by Kari Skogland
2000s Canadian films